John C. Giles (born 1960) is an American politician serving as the 40th mayor of Mesa, Arizona. A Republican, Giles previously served as a member of the Mesa City Council from 1996 to 2000. Giles was elected mayor of Mesa in a special election following the resignation of then-Mayor Scott Smith. In 2022, Giles was censured by the Arizona Republican Party over his endorsement of Mark Kelly in the 2022 United States Senate election.

Early life and education
Giles was born in Mesa, Arizona. He graduated from Westwood High School in 1978. He attended Brigham Young University, graduating with a political science degree in 1984. Giles received his Juris Doctor degree from the Sandra Day O'Connor College of Law in 1987.

Career 
Giles works as a lawyer with the firm Giles & Dickson. Giles was the president of the East Valley Bar Association from 1992 until 1993.

He was elected to the Mesa City Council in 1996, serving until 2000, including a term as vice mayor from 1998 until 2000.

Mayor of Mesa, Arizona (2014-present) 
Following Mayor Scott Smith's resignation in 2014, Giles was elected mayor in a special election, for a term lasting until 2017. He was sworn in on September 18, 2014. In 2016, Giles was reelected to a full four-year term, which is set to last until 2021. Giles began his second full term in January 2021. 

His key areas of focus include 5Es: Emergency Response, Equality & Compassion, Education, Environment and Economic Growth. Mayor Giles has overseen a growing economy that’s added thousands of new jobs and over $3.65 billion in new capital investment and employers like Meta, who is joining Google and Apple in the Elliot Road Technology Corridor, ElectraMeccanica in the Gateway Area and Amazon in the Falcon Business District.  He is bringing renewed focus and attention to Mesa’s downtown resulting in a new Arizona State University facility with cutting edge programs and budding creative economy with new businesses, restaurants and entertainment options. Education and building Mesa’s workforce are top priorities for Mayor Giles. He spearheads the Mesa College Promise that provides qualified graduates with a free community college education. The Promise and the Mesa Education & Workforce Development Roundtable are building Mesa’s future workforce. He also chairs the Arizona Mayor’s Education Roundtable. As mayor, Giles led the adoption of a city-wide Non Discrimination Ordinance and Climate Action Plan.

Political positions
Giles is a registered Republican, although the position of mayor is officially nonpartisan. He has a leadership role as a trustee in the United States Conference of Mayors. Giles endorsed Democrat Mark Kelly in the 2022 U.S. Senate election.

Mayor Giles is Chair of the Immigration Task Force for the U.S. Conference of Mayors Board of Trustees and is a member of the Mayor’s Challenge to End Veterans Homelessness. He also serves as Chair of the Maricopa Association of Governments (MAG) and is Vice Chair of the Mayor’s Alliance to End Childhood Hunger.

Personal life
Giles and his wife, Dawn, have five children and eight grandchildren. Giles is a marathoner and triathlete who has completed two full Ironman competitions, 20 marathons and four Boston Marathons.

Electoral history

See also
 List of mayors of the 50 largest cities in the United States

References

External links
 
 
 Campaign website
 Mayoral website

Arizona city council members
Arizona Republicans
Brigham Young University alumni
Latter Day Saints from Arizona
Mayors of Mesa, Arizona
Sandra Day O'Connor College of Law alumni
Politicians from Mesa, Arizona
21st-century American politicians
Living people
20th-century births
Year of birth uncertain